A scrutineer (also called a poll-watcher or a challenger in the United States) is a person who observes any process which requires rigorous oversight. Scrutineers have the tasks of preventing the occurrence of corruption and of detecting genuine mistakes.
The scrutineering process takes place most commonly alongside voting in an election; the scrutineer observes the counting of ballot papers, in order to ensure that election rules are followed. There are other uses of the concept, such as in motorsport, when a scrutineer is responsible for ensuring that vehicles meet the technical regulations.

Politics 

Rules vary concerning the number of scrutineers from a political party who are allowed to be present at each polling station. In some jurisdictions, each candidate or party may have one scrutineer or poll-watcher per constituency or  precinct where voting or counting takes place. In other jurisdictions, such as in Australia and in Canada, each party is permitted to appoint one or two scrutineers per polling-booth. Scrutineers are often required to refrain from contact with voters, from wearing or displaying political slogans, or from otherwise exerting influence on the conduct of the election while it is taking place. Scrutineers also report back unofficial results to their campaign headquarters, as the official results can take some time to be issued.

Sport

Scrutineers play an important role in many motorsports. Racing series typically have a set of technical regulations to which the cars, bikes or other vehicles must conform. The role of the scrutineer in this case is to confirm that vehicles entered for the race meet the relevant regulations.

Design and engineering

Someone who carefully verifies the accuracy of technical specifications, drawings, or configurations as they apply to a specific discipline field.

Competitive dance

Dancing competitions (especially dancesport) employ (usually  professionally certified) officials who oversee judging and tabulate scores. Software is often used to aid with tabulation.

See also 
 Election monitoring

References

External links
 Scrutineer’s Handbook for federal elections published by the Australian Electoral Commission

Political terminology
Motorsport terminology
Voting